The Porsche V4 engine is a two-liter, four-stroke, mono-turbocharged, V-4, racing engine, designed, developed, and built by German manufacturer Porsche, for their 919 Hybrid sports car prototype, between 2014 and 2017.

Background
The compact and lightweight engine was a  90-degree V4 cylinder bank mid-mounted mono-turbocharged petrol engine. It ran at 9,000 rpm, with performance coming from a direct fuel-injection system and a single Garrett-designed turbocharger with a dual overhead camshaft. Due to the small size of the engine, the transmission casing was fitted to the rear suspension and was almost a third of the car's length. Engine cooling was achieved through a carbon-fiber-and-gold thermal airbox in its center. Front airflow was enabled by  louvers along its flank, and a single curved roll-hoop intake was mounted on its roof to allow air cooling.

Applications
Porsche 919 Hybrid

References

Porsche
Engines by model
Gasoline engines by model
Porsche in motorsport
V4 engines